The Album is the debut studio album by English punk rock band Eater, released in 1977 by record label The Label.

Reception 

In Trouser Press, Jack Rabid called The Album "uneven but spirited", highlighting the band's "hilariously trashy sped-up covers".

Musician Henry Rollins listed it as one of his 20 favorite punk albums.

Track listing

References

External links 
 

1977 debut albums
Eater (band) albums